Joe Bettasso is an American football player and coach, who is currently the defensive coordinator for the Missouri Southern Lions. Bettasso served as the interim head coach for 2018. Bettasso was formerly the defensive coordinator at McKendree University and, prior to that, Quincy University. Bettasso was the head football coach at McPherson College from 2010 to 2011, compiling a record of 14–8.

Coaching career
Bettasso was the 27th head football coach at McPherson College in McPherson, Kansas and he held that position for the 2010 and 2011 seasons. His coaching record at McPherson was 14–8. 

Following a 10–0 regular season in 2010, Bettasso's McPherson Bulldogs won the Kansas Collegiate Athletic Conference (KCAC) title and was seeded sixth in the 2010 NAIA Football National Championship. They suffered their first and only loss in the first round, losing to the 12th-ranked McKendree Bearcats. Bettasso was named conference coach of the year in 2010.

After completion of the 2011 season, he resigned to become the defensive backs coach at NCAA Division II Quincy University in Quincy, Illinois.

Head coaching record

References

External links
 Missouri Southern profile

Year of birth missing (living people)
Living people
American football defensive backs
McKendree Bearcats football coaches
McPherson Bulldogs football coaches
Missouri Southern Lions football coaches
Missouri Southern Lions football players
Quincy Hawks football coaches